Gnamptonyx is a genus of moths in the family Erebidae.

Species
Gnamptonyx australis Viette, 1965
Gnamptonyx innexa (Walker, 1858)
Gnamptonyx obsoleta Hampson, 1913

References
Natural History Museum Lepidoptera genus database

Ophiusini
Moth genera